Death Drives Through is a 1935 British sports drama film directed by Edward L. Cahn and starring Chili Bouchier, Robert Douglas and Miles Mander. It was made as a quota quickie by the independent producer Clifford Taylor at Ealing Studios. The racing scenes were shot at Brooklands.

Cast
 Chili Bouchier as Kay Lord  
 Robert Douglas as Kit Woods 
 Miles Mander as Garry Ames  
 Percy Walsh as Mr. Lord 
 Frank Atkinson as John Larson 
 Lillian Gunns as Binnie
 Andreas Malandrinos as Crew Member (uncredited)

References

Bibliography
 Chibnall, Steve. Quota Quickies: The British of the British 'B' Film. British Film Institute, 2007.
 Low, Rachael. Filmmaking in 1930s Britain. George Allen & Unwin, 1985.
 Perry, George. Forever Ealing. Pavilion Books, 1994.
 Wood, Linda. British Films, 1927-1939. British Film Institute, 1986.

External links

1935 films
British sports drama films
British black-and-white films
1930s sports drama films
1930s English-language films
Films directed by Edward L. Cahn
Ealing Studios films
Films set in England
Films shot in England
British auto racing films
Films with screenplays by John Huston
Quota quickies
1935 drama films
1930s British films